Ameridion is a genus of comb-footed spiders that was first described by J. Wunderlich in 1995.

Species
 it contains twenty-seven species, found in the Caribbean, South America, Costa Rica, Nicaragua, Panama, Guatemala, and Mexico:
Ameridion armouri (Levi, 1959) – Panama, Trinidad
Ameridion aspersum (F. O. Pickard-Cambridge, 1902) – Guatemala
Ameridion atlixco (Levi, 1959) – Mexico
Ameridion bridgesi (Levi, 1959) – Mexico
Ameridion chilapa (Levi, 1959) – Mexico
Ameridion clemens (Levi, 1959) – Jamaica
Ameridion cobanum (Levi, 1959) – Guatemala
Ameridion colima (Levi, 1959) – Mexico, Ecuador
Ameridion lathropi (Levi, 1959) – Panama
Ameridion malkini (Levi, 1959) – Mexico
Ameridion marvum (Levi, 1959) – Panama, Venezuela
Ameridion moctezuma (Levi, 1959) – Mexico
Ameridion musawas (Levi, 1959) – Nicaragua
Ameridion paidiscum (Levi, 1959) – Panama
Ameridion panum (Levi, 1959) – Panama
Ameridion petrum (Levi, 1959) (type) – Panama, Trinidad, Peru
Ameridion plantatum (Levi, 1959) – Panama
Ameridion progum (Levi, 1959) – Panama
Ameridion quantum (Levi, 1959) – Costa Rica, Panama
Ameridion reservum (Levi, 1959) – Panama
Ameridion rinconense (Levi, 1959) – Mexico
Ameridion ruinum (Levi, 1959) – Mexico
Ameridion schmidti (Levi, 1959) – Costa Rica
Ameridion signaculum (Levi, 1959) – Panama, Brazil
Ameridion signum (Levi, 1959) – Panama
Ameridion tempum (Levi, 1959) – Panama, Brazil
Ameridion unanimum (Keyserling, 1891) – Mexico to Brazil

In synonymy:
A. quemadum  = Ameridion unanimum (Keyserling, 1891)

See also
 List of Theridiidae species

References

Araneomorphae genera
Spiders of Central America
Spiders of Mexico
Spiders of South America
Spiders of the Caribbean
Theridiidae